Chadron State College (CSC) is a public college in Chadron, Nebraska. It is one of three public colleges in the Nebraska State College System. It practices open admissions.

The school opened in June 1911, although a previous institution dated from the late 19th century. The college has an enrollment of about 3,000 students. Five of its 25 major buildings are listed in the National Register of Historic Places.

History 
Chadron State College was founded in 1909 by the Nebraska Legislature to provide a higher education institution in northwest Nebraska.  The Board of Education of State Normal Schools selected Chadron as the location of its fourth institution in January 1910. The school opened in June 1911.

Chadron State College is the only four-year and graduate-degree granting college in western Nebraska, and is accredited by the Higher Learning Commission and subject-oriented accrediting agencies.

Presidents 

 Joseph Sparks (1911–1916)
 Robert I. Elliott (1916–1940)
 E.L. Rouse (acting) (1939–1941)
 Wiley G. Brooks (1941–1954)
 Barton L. Kline (1954–1961)
 F. Clark Elkins (1961–1967)
 Edwin C. Nelson (1967–1973)
 Larry G. Tangeman (1973–1975)
 Edwin C. Nelson (1975–1986)
 Samuel H. Rankin (1986–1998)
 Thomas L. Krepel (1998–2005)
 Janie C. Park (2005–2012)
 Richard R. Rhine (2012–present)

2006 Spotted Tail wildfire 

In late July 2006, the college was in danger of damage from a wildfire. The Spotted Tail fire was caused by a lightning strike on July 26 about seven miles (11 km) south of Chadron. By July 28, the wildfire reached the edge of Chadron and the college campus. Fire crews prevented the wildfire from reaching the campus. The Pine Ridge escarpment south of the college, including C-Hill, was deforested as a result of the fire.

Facilities 

The  campus has 25 major buildings, five of which are listed in the National Register of Historic Places. Their replacement value is more than $60 million and they provide more than 1 million square feet (92,900 square meters) of floor space. Classrooms, laboratory, and research facilities are available in seven classroom buildings and the library.

The library contains the equivalent of more than 250,000 volumes. Its automated catalogue is part of the Nebraska State College network.

Since the 1980s, the college has built several new facilities, including the Edwin and Avis Nelson Physical Activity Center, a wood-fired heating plant, the Student Center, the Lindeken-Carillon Clock Tower, a softball field, the Chicoine Center athletic facility, the Eagle Ridge housing complex, and the Rangeland Complex. An outdoor track is under construction as of 2020. Multiple buildings have been renovated since 2004, including Joseph Sparks Hall, which houses administrative and alumni offices; Edna Work Hall, a dormitory; the former Administration Building, now called Old Admin, which houses academic programs and classrooms; and Don Beebe Stadium, including the rebuilt Con Marshall Press Box and Elliott Field. The college's Math Science Building is currently being renovated and is planning to be reopened Spring 2022.

Students can live in seven housing spaces.

Buildings 

Residence Halls
 Albert Kent Hall (1965)
 Eagle Ridge (2014)
 Edna Work Hall and Edna Work Wing (1932)
 High Rise (1967)
 Lyle Andrews Hall (1966)
 Wiley Brooks Hall (occupied by Math and Science faculty during Math Science Center of Innovative Learning renovation, 2020-2022)
Other campus buildings, areas and offices
 Adelaide Miller Hall (1921; psychology, sociology, and social work programs)
 Burkhiser Technology Complex (1971; business, family and consumer sciences programs)
 Chicoine Center (2014; athletics, primary indoor competition space)
 Don Beebe Stadium with Con Marshall Press Box and Robert Elliott Field (football)
 Edwin and Avis Nelson Physical Activity Center (indoor track, student activity space; health, physical education and recreation program)
 Eugene Sheaman Heating Plant (1959)
 Edwin Crites Hall (1938; admissions, business office, registrar, student services)
 Glenn Hildreth Hall (1926; storage)
 Joseph Sparks Hall (1915; administration, alumni, college relations, human resources, Chadron State Foundation)
 Maintenance Building
 Mari Sandoz High Plains Heritage Center (1929; museum and presentation space)
 Math Science Center of Innovative Learning (museums, planetarium; mathematics, science programs)
 Memorial Hall (1954; art galleries, auditorium; houses art, music, theatre programs)
 Old Admin (1911; formerly Administration Building; education, English, justice studies, social sciences, communication programs)
 Outdoor track (2020)
 Rangeland Complex (2013; rodeo arena; rangeland program)
 Reta E. King Library (1966)
 Ross Armstrong Gymnasium (1964; athletics, secondary indoor competition space)
 Softball field (2006)
 Student Center and Lindeken-Carillon Clock Tower (1990; apparel store, cafeteria, meeting rooms, ballroom)
Former campus buildings
 Barton Kline Campus Center (former student center)
 West Court (apartments)

Academics 

Chadron State College offers more than 49 majors leading to bachelor's degrees and 8 professional studies options. Pre-professional programs in the health sciences are available, including the Rural Health Opportunities Program (RHOP) conducted jointly with the University of Nebraska Medical Center.

Training is offered in several academic and pre-professional programs. The academic areas are divided into the School of Liberal Arts; the School of Business, Mathematics, and Science; and the School of Professional Studies and Applied Sciences. The college offers four-year degrees as well as graduate programs leading to master's degrees. Pre-professional training is offered for careers in medicine and law.

Through its distance learning programs, the college provides off-campus and online services throughout western Nebraska. Courses are available each semester in Scottsbluff at Western Nebraska Community College or the Panhandle Education Center. Courses also are offered at Alliance, North Platte, and Sidney.

Chadron State College offers courses and workshops each summer. The college has online classes available throughout the year.

Student life 
There are more than 50 student clubs and organizations on campus. Athletes have earned 97 All-American and 38 Academic All-American/Scholar-Athlete honors since 1980. In addition, the college has an Army ROTC program and a rodeo team.

The college helps support the Post Playhouse at nearby Fort Robinson each summer. The Galaxy Series and Distinguished Speaker Series have brought noted entertainers and speakers to the college, including 2005 U.S. Poet Laureate Ted Kooser.

Athletics 

Chadron State College, whose athletic teams are known as the Eagles, competes in the National Collegiate Athletic Association Division II. Chadron State sponsors 12 varsity athletic teams: men's and women's basketball; men's and women's cross country; football; women's golf; softball; men's and women's track and field; women's volleyball; and men's and women's wrestling.

Notable alumni 
 Jim Anderson – Republican member of Wyoming Senate (2001-incumbent); member of Wyoming House of Representatives (1997–2000)
 Don Beebe – Professional football player
 Val Logsdon Fitch – Nobel Prize-winning nuclear physicist (attended for three years before being drafted into U.S. Army in 1943)
 John Freudenberg – Associate Justice of the Nebraska Supreme Court
 Garrett Gilkey – Professional football player
 Jerry D. Mahlman – Meteorologist and global warming expert
 Steve McClain – Head basketball coach for University of Illinois at Chicago, coached University of Wyoming from 1998 to 2007
 Lolo Letalu Matalasi Moliga – Governor of American Samoa (2013—)
 Larry Riley – Professional basketball coach
 Togiola Tulafono – Governor of American Samoa (2003—2013)
 Tim Walz – Governor of Minnesota
 Danny Woodhead – Professional football player

References

External links 
 
 Chadron State Athletics website

 
Buildings and structures in Dawes County, Nebraska
Chadron, Nebraska
Education in Dawes County, Nebraska
Educational institutions established in 1911
Nebraska State College System
Public universities and colleges in Nebraska
1911 establishments in Nebraska